Agata Kulesza is a Polish actress who has appeared on film, television, and stage. She has won four Polish Film Awards; three for her leading roles in the films Rose (2011), Ida (2013), and 25 lat niewinności. Sprawa Tomka Komendy (2020); and for her supporting role in I'm a Killer (2016).

Early life 
Kulesza was born and raised in Szczecin, West Pomeranian Voivodeship, the daughter of a sailor. While she was in high school, she decided she wanted to be an actress; in 1994, she graduated from the Aleksander Zelwerowicz National Academy of Dramatic Art in Warsaw.

Career 
Following her graduation, Kulesza worked as an actress at the Teatr Dramatyczny in Warsaw. Since 2011, she has regularly performed at the Ateneum Theatre, also in Warsaw. Kulesza is a member of the Polish Film Academy.

In 2008 Kulesza, alongside her professional partner Stefano Terrazzino, won the eighth series of Dancing with the Stars: Taniec z gwiazdami. She donated her winnings, a Porsche car, to an auction to benefit the Great Orchestra of Christmas Charity.

In 2012, Kulesza won her first Polish Film Award for Best Actress for her role Róża, a Masurian widow who falls in love a Home Army solider, in the 2011 historical drama Rose, directed by Wojciech Smarzowski That same year, she was given a special award from the Ministry of Culture and National Heritage recognising her acting career, as well as the Złota Kaczka awarded by Film magazine. 

In 2013, Kulesza starred in Paweł Pawlikowski's drama film Ida. Playing Wanda Gruz, a Communist resistance fighter turned state prosecutor, Kulesza was awarded the Best Actress prize at the 38th Gdynia Film Festival, and won her second Polish Film Award for Best Actress. Kulesza went on to be nominated for the Paszport Polityki. Internationally, Kulesza won the Los Angeles Film Critics Association Award for Best Supporting Actress, and Ida was nominated for the Academy Award for Best International Feature Film.

In 2016, Zwierciadło magazine awarded Kulesza their Crystal Mirror award for "acting of the highest quality". That year, she turned down an offer to play Beata in the political satire series The Chairman's Ear.

Personal life 
Between 2006 and 2020, Kulesza was married to cameraman Marcin Figurski, having met him in 1996; they had a daughter, Marianna, in 1997. It was reported in the Polish press that Figurski had been domestically abusive towards Kulesza.

Kulesza has been friends with musician Kasia Nosowska since childhood, with them both growing up in Sczczecin. As of 2016, she lives in Warsaw.

Recognition 
In addition to winning four Polish Film Awards, Kulesza has also been recognised with several governmental awards for her acting career.
 Order of Polonia Restituta (2014)
 Silver Medal for Merit to Culture – Gloria Artis (2014)

Filmography

References

External links
 
 Agata Kulesza, Culture.pl

20th-century Polish actresses
21st-century Polish actresses
Actors from Szczecin
Living people
Polish film actresses
Polish stage actresses
Polish television actresses
Aleksander Zelwerowicz National Academy of Dramatic Art in Warsaw alumni
Recipients of the Silver Medal for Merit to Culture – Gloria Artis